Edward Elliot's Beach, simply called as Elliot's Beach and popularly known as Besant Nagar Beach or the Bessie, is a natural urban beach located in the Besant Nagar neighbourhood of Chennai, Tamil Nadu, India. It is located next to the southern tip of the Marina Beach, and was named after Edward Elliot, a chief magistrate and superintendent of police of the Madras Presidency in colonial India. It has the Shrine of Our Lady of Good Health—also known as Annai Vailankanni Church—on its shore, and the Ashtalakshmi Temple nearby.

During the colonial era, Elliot's beach was fairly exclusive to white people only. Today, the beach and its Kaj Schmidt Memorial are cultural landmarks of Chennai, visited by thousands daily. Safety on and around the beach is ensured by a police outpost and all-terrain vehicles (ATVs).

Karl Schmidt memorial

A prominent landmark on this beach is the Karl Schmidt Memorial. The memorial is named after the Dutch sailor who lost his life trying to save a girl from drowning.

Elliot's Beach is one of the cleanest and safest beaches in the city of Chennai. It is located towards the south of Marina Beach.

The Ashtalakshmi Temple, located near the southern end of the beach, was built in 1976 in modern style of architecture.

Safety 
There a police outpost on the beach, which is policed by all-terrain vehicles (ATVs). In 2010, there were 11 drowning cases reported off the beach. In August 2012, the government sanctioned two more all-terrain vehicles for patrolling the beach.

See also

Marina Beach
Golden Beach
List of beaches in India

References

Beaches of Tamil Nadu
Tourist attractions in Chennai